Isaac Jason Hilliard (born April 5, 1976) is a former American football wide receiver and coach. He played college football for the University of Florida, and earned All-American honors. He was a first-round pick by the New York Giants in the 1997 NFL Draft and also played for the Tampa Bay Buccaneers before retiring in 2008.

Early years 
Hilliard was born in Patterson, Louisiana in 1976. He attended Patterson High School, where he was a star high school football player for the Patterson Lumberjacks. During his senior year, he played quarterback, wingback, and free safety. That year, he rushed for 737 yards and 12 touchdowns, caught 20 passes for 310 yards and two touchdowns, had 45 tackles and intercepted five passes. He was rated among the top 10 defensive backs in the Southeast, but he had his heart set on playing wide receiver.

College career 

Hilliard accepted an athletic scholarship to attend the University of Florida in Gainesville, Florida, where he played wide receiver for coach Steve Spurrier's Florida Gators football team from 1994 to 1996 although never having played the position before. During his three seasons as a Gator, the team won three SEC Championships in 1994, 1995, and 1996.  As a junior in 1996, he was paired with fellow Gators receiver Reidel Anthony and both posted 1,000-yard seasons, and both Hilliard and Anthony were recognized as first-team All-Southeastern Conference (SEC) selections and consensus first-team All-Americans, as the Gators won the Bowl Alliance national championship—their first-ever national football title.  Hilliard's efforts made him a semi-finalist for the Fred Biletnikoff Award in 1996. The Gators finished the season with a record of 12–1 after a 52–20 victory over the top-ranked Florida State Seminoles in the 1997 Sugar Bowl. Hilliard had a sensational performance in the 1997 Sugar Bowl victory for Florida against their arch rival Florida State. His most well known play occurred during this game, as he snagged a Danny Wuerffel pass, took one hard step towards the end zone, then stopped on a dime, avoiding Seminole defenders as he dashed the remaining 15 yards to the end zone. It was the second of a Sugar Bowl-record three touchdowns for Hilliard and it gave the Gators a 24–10 advantage in what ended as a 52-20 Florida victory. Memorably, he set three Sugar Bowl Records against the Seminoles at the time: he had 150 receiving yards, including an 82-yard touchdown catch, and scored a total of three touchdowns for eighteen points.

Hilliard was among the members of the 11th Anniversary class inducted into the Florida-Georgia Hall of Fame. Hilliard's signature game against Georgia came in 1995, when he hauled in five passes for 99 yards and two touchdowns, as the Gators claimed a 52–17 victory over the Bulldogs. He was inducted into the University of Florida Athletic Hall of Fame as a "Gator Great" in 2009.

Hilliard was honored as an SEC Legend in 2011. He was chosen for The Florida Football All-Century Team, chosen by Gator fans and compiled by The Gainesville Sun in the fall of 1999. Additionally, he was selected to The 100th-Anniversary Florida Team that was selected in 2006 to celebrate a century of Florida football. Fans voted by mail and online.

SEC Record Book 
 2011 SEC Football Legend
 1996 Consensus All-American
 5th Career receiving touchdowns (29) 1994-1996
 18th Career receiving yards per reception (17.6)
 1st wide receiver combination in SEC history to have 1,000 yards receiving in the same season. Chris Doering (1,045) and Ike Hilliard (1,008) 1995

Florida Career Record Book 

 1st All-time in receiving touchdowns in a single game (4) 1995
 2nd All-time receiving touchdowns (29) 1994-1996
 4th All-time receiving touchdowns in a single season (15) 1995
 7th All-time in Receiving yards (2,214) 1994-1996
 8th All-time receiving yards in a single game (192) 1995

Sugar Bowl Record Book 
 1st Most Touchdowns, Receiving 
 9th Most Receiving Yards
 3rd Highest Average per Reception

Hilliard declared himself eligible for the NFL Draft after his junior season, and finished his college career with 126 receptions for 2,214 yards and twenty-nine touchdowns. In a 2006 series published by The Gainesville Sun, he was recognized as No. 14 among the 100 all-time greatest Gator players from the first century of Florida football.

Professional career

New York Giants 
The New York wide receiver had 10 receptions for 155 yards and two touchdowns to help his team reach Super Bowl XXXV following the  regular season. A string of injuries kept him from the field throughout his time with the Giants. During the second game of his rookie year, Hilliard was hit by Jacksonville safety Chris Hudson and sustained a sprained interspinous ligament between his sixth and seventh vertebrae. He underwent posterior spine stabilization surgery which fused the two vertebrae. After an 8-month rehabilitation period, Hilliard was named the Ed Block Courage Award recipient, voted for by their teammates as role models of inspiration, sportsmanship, and courage. He continued his level of play with disregard for his personal safety with a cringe-inducing medical record: bruised lungs and a bruised sternum in 2000; foot surgery before the 2001 season; a dislocated shoulder in 2002. He finished his career with the Giants with 368 receptions for 4,630 yards and twenty-seven touchdowns. After a distinguished career that includes ranking 6th in franchise history in receptions and 10th in receiving yards, on July 30, 2010, he signed a one-day contract to retire as a New York Giant.

Tampa Bay Buccaneers 
Hilliard signed with the Tampa Bay Buccaneers after the 2004 season. During his first two seasons with Tampa Bay, he was used mainly as a third or fourth receiver, but in 2007 he started ten games making sixty-two receptions for 722 yards. During his time with the Bucs, he became a third down specialist, 111 of 178 career catches resulting in a 1st down. Head Coach Jon Gruden referred to him as "Third and Ike". On October 19, 2008, Hilliard refused to be carted off the field during a Sunday Night Football 20–10 win over the Seattle Seahawks after a helmet-to-helmet hit by Seattle linebacker Leroy Hill, who hit Hilliard in a head-on collision as Seahawks linebacker Lofa Tatupu hit him from behind, forcing his body to go limp after making a catch in the second quarter. 
After four seasons, Hilliard was released by the Buccaneers on February 25, 2009. He was one of five veterans that the Bucs released on that day. The others were wide receiver Joey Galloway, running back Warrick Dunn and linebackers Derrick Brooks and Cato June. The Bucs had previously fired Head Coach Jon Gruden and General Manager Bruce Allen and were looking to build a younger team under the likes of Raheem Morris and Mark Dominik.

In his twelve-season NFL career, Hilliard appeared in 161 regular season games, started 105 of them, and made 546 catches for 6,397 yards and thirty-five touchdowns. He also had 126 rushing yards on sixteen attempts.

NFL career statistics 
Receiving statistics 

Returning statistics

Coaching career

Florida Tuskers 
Forced to retire after a string of injuries and nine surgeries, Hilliard became a volunteer receivers coach for the UFL's Florida Tuskers, a charter UFL franchise based in Orlando, Florida. In 2010, he became the Tuskers' new wide receivers coach for the season. He worked alongside Head Coach Jim Haslett and Offensive Coordinator Jay Gruden. The Tuskers appeared in the first two UFL Championship Games, losing both to the Las Vegas Locomotives. In 2010, the league suspended the Tuskers' operations and moved the remnants of the team to Virginia Beach to assume the identity (and some executive staff) of a previously announced expansion team that was to begin play in 2011.

Miami Dolphins 
In 2011, Hilliard returned to the NFL as an assistant wide receivers coach for the Miami Dolphins under Head Coach Tony Sparano assisting in the development of Brandon Marshall and Brian Hartline.

Washington Redksins 
In 2012, Hilliard was hired by Mike Shanahan of the Washington Redskins as the wide receivers coach. He oversaw a unit that had four wide receivers with at least 500 receiving yards or more (Santana Moss, Leonard Hankerson, Josh Morgan and Pierre Garçon). The Redskins ended the regular season with a 7-game winning streak to finish with a 10–6 record, leading to a NFC East division championship and a 4th seed spot in the playoffs. It was their first division title since 1999.

Buffalo Bills 
In 2013, the Buffalo Bills hired Hilliard as the wide receivers coach. Hilliard oversaw a young group of receivers that included veteran Steve Johnson and rookies Robert Woods and Marquise Goodwin.

Washington Redskins 
In January 2014, Hilliard was reunited with Jay Gruden when the Head Coach named Hilliard the wide receivers coach of the Washington Redskins of the NFL. This would be his second stint with the Redskins reunited with a veteran unit that included Pierre Garçon, DeSean Jackson and Santana Moss. In the 2015 season, the Redskins made a return to the playoffs since their appearance in 2012. The Redskins would go on a 4-game winning streak to finish the season, and win the NFC East with a 9–7 record. However, the Redskins lost to the Green Bay Packers in the Wild Card round 35–18, ending their season. During the 2019 season, Hilliard helped to develop a group of rookie wide receivers which included Terry McLaurin, Kelvin Harmon and Steven Sims. McLaurin finished the season with 58 receptions for 919 yards and 7 touchdowns, and was named to the PFWA All-Rookie Team.

Pittsburgh Steelers 
Hilliard joined the Pittsburgh Steelers to be their wide receivers coach in February 2020. Rookie Chase Claypool was selected by the Pittsburgh Steelers in the second round, 49th overall, in the 2020 NFL Draft as the team's first selection. Under Hilliard, Claypool became the first Steelers rookie in franchise history to score four touchdowns in a game, and the first Steeler since Roy Jefferson in 1968 to do so. Claypool also became the only wide receiver in NFL history to accomplish this feat in the same game. His performance helped the team start out with a 4–0 record for the first time since 1979. On October 14, 2020, Claypool was named the AFC Offensive Player of the Week for his performance in Week 5. Claypool would finish the season passing former Steelers wideout Troy Edwards for the most receptions by a rookie in franchise history, snagging his 62nd of the season on the touchdown pass from quarterback Mason Rudolph during Week 17. Claypool also tied Pro Football Hall of Famer Franco Harris and former Steelers wide receiver Louis Lipps for the most touchdowns scored by a Steelers rookie in a single season with 11. Both records added to an already impressive first season for the former Notre Dame wideout, who won the Joe Greene Great Performance Award as the Steelers' top rookie and was named to the PFWA All-Rookie Team. Under Hilliard, WR Diontae Johnson finished the 2021 season with 107 receptions for 1,161 receiving yards and eight receiving touchdowns in 16 games. Diontae Johnson was then named to his first Pro Bowl, replacing Bengals receiver Ja'Marr Chase. Following the 2021 season, Hilliard's contract was not renewed by the team.

Auburn Tigers 
Hilliard was hired on February 23, 2022, to be Auburn's new Wide Receivers Coach. After the dismissal of head coach, Bryan Harsin in October 2022, Hilliard was named interim Co-Offensive Coordinator.

Personal life 

Hilliard is the nephew of former New Orleans Saints running back Dalton Hilliard.  His cousin Kenny Hilliard is a former NFL Player. He and his wife, Lourdes, met at the University of Florida and have been married for 21 years. He has five children. After declaring for the 1997 NFL Draft as a true junior and spending 23 seasons in the NFL (as a player and coach), Hilliard returned to the University of Florida to complete his degree. He worked as an NFL coach while quietly working to complete his degree from 2013 to 2018.

See also 

 1996 College Football All-America Team
 Florida Gators football, 1990–99
 History of the Tampa Bay Buccaneers
 List of Florida Gators football All-Americans
 List of Florida Gators in the NFL Draft
 List of New York Giants players
 List of University of Florida Athletic Hall of Fame members

References 

 Carlson, Norm, University of Florida Football Vault: The History of the Florida Gators, Whitman Publishing, LLC, Atlanta, Georgia (2007).  .
 Golenbock, Peter, Go Gators!  An Oral History of Florida's Pursuit of Gridiron Glory, Legends Publishing, LLC, St. Petersburg, Florida (2002).  .
 Hairston, Jack, Tales from the Gator Swamp: A Collection of the Greatest Gator Stories Ever Told, Sports Publishing, LLC, Champaign, Illinois (2002).  .
 McCarthy, Kevin M., Fightin' Gators: A History of University of Florida Football, Arcadia Publishing, Mount Pleasant, South Carolina (2000).  .
 Nash, Noel, ed., The Gainesville Sun Presents The Greatest Moments in Florida Gators Football, Sports Publishing, Inc., Champaign, Illinois (1998).  .

1976 births
Living people
People from Patterson, Louisiana
Players of American football from Louisiana
African-American players of American football
American football wide receivers
Florida Gators football players
All-American college football players
New York Giants players
Tampa Bay Buccaneers players
African-American coaches of American football
Coaches of American football from Louisiana
Florida Tuskers coaches
Miami Dolphins coaches
Washington Redskins coaches
Buffalo Bills coaches
Pittsburgh Steelers coaches
21st-century African-American sportspeople
20th-century African-American sportspeople
Ed Block Courage Award recipients